Cyamiidae is a family of marine bivalve clams of the superfamily Cyamioidea.

Genera
Genera in the family Cyamiidae:
 Cyamium Philippi, 1845
 Gaimardia Gould, 1852
 Kidderia Dall, 1876
 Perrierina Bernard, 1897

References

 
 
 Powell A. W. B., New Zealand Mollusca, William Collins Publishers Ltd, Auckland, New Zealand 1979 

 
Bivalve families